Fisher is a village in Champaign County, Illinois, United States, that was founded in 1875. The population was 1,881 at the 2010 census.

Geography
Fisher is located at  (40.315817, -88.348601).

Demographics

As of the 2020 census there were 2,062 people, 702 households, and 529 families residing in the village. The racial makeup of the village was 94.28% White, 0.44% African American, 0.05% Native American, 0.44% Asian, 0.63% from other races, and 4.17% from two or more races. Hispanic or Latino of any race were 1.50% of the population.

There were 702 households, out of which 71.51% had children under the age of 18 living with them, 59.26% were married couples living together, 7.83% had a female householder with no husband present, and 24.64% were non-families. 19.80% of all households were made up of individuals, and 9.54% had someone living alone who was 65 years of age or older. The average household size was 3.16 and the average family size was 2.73.

The village's age distribution consisted of 27.4% under the age of 18, 6.5% from 18 to 24, 32.3% from 25 to 44, 21.7% from 45 to 64, and 12.0% who were 65 years of age or older. The median age was 32.6 years. For every 100 females, there were 102.2 males. For every 100 females age 18 and over, there were 114.0 males.

The median income for a household in the village was $71,136, and the median income for a family was $88,177. Males had a median income of $46,744 versus $37,717 for females. The per capita income for the village was $33,378. About 2.8% of families and 3.6% of the population were below the poverty line, including 6.5% of those under age 18 and 5.7% of those age 65 or over.

Education
The community is served by the Fisher Community Unit School District.   The public schools are Fisher Grade School  [kindergarten through sixth grade]  and the Fisher Junior/Senior High School, whose mascot is the Fisher "Bunnie." The Bunnies offer six girls' sports, seven boys' sports and two co-ed sports at the senior high-school level  and six  competitive sports for junior-high students.

See also

 List of municipalities in Illinois

References

External links

 

Villages in Champaign County, Illinois
Villages in Illinois
1875 establishments in Illinois
Populated places established in 1875